Lunax (Gascon: Lunats or Lunacs) is a former commune in the Haute-Garonne department in southwestern France. On 1 January 2017, it was merged into the commune Péguilhan.

Geography
The river Gesse forms all of the commune's eastern border; the Gimone forms all of its western border.

Population

References

Former communes of Haute-Garonne